The 2022 FC Astana season was the fourteenth successive season that FC Astana will play in the Kazakhstan Premier League, the highest tier of association football in Kazakhstan. They finished as Champions of the Premier League, having finished second the previous season behind Tobol. Astana also reached the Semifinals of the Kazakhstan Cup where they were knocked out by Ordabasy, and the Second Qualifying round of the Europa Conference League where they were defeated by Raków Częstochowa.

Season events
At the end of the previous season, Astana appointed Srđan Blagojević as their head coach.

On 14 January, Astana announced the signings of Marko Milošević from Caspiy and Artsyom Rakhmanaw from Rukh Brest, both on contracts until the end of the 2023 season, and the signing of Bryan from Atyrau on a contract until the end of 2022.

On 19 January, Astana announced the signing of Kamo Hovhannisyan from Kairat. The following day, 20 January, Astana announced the signing of Aslan Darabayev, who'd previously played for Caspiy.

On 27 January, Astana announced the signing of Danylo Beskorovainyi on loan from DAC 1904 for the season, with the option to make the move permanent.

On 16 February, Astana announced the signing of Jérémy Manzorro.

On 18 February, Astana announced the signing of Dzyanis Palyakow.

On 11 March, Shakhter Karagandy were awarded a 3-0 technical victory over Astana after Astana fielded seven Foreign Players on the pitch at the same time during their match on 5 March 2022.

On 25 March, Astana announced the signing of Rai Vloet from Heracles Almelo.

On 11 July, Astana announced the signing of Timur Dosmagambetov from Shakhter Karagandy. Four days later, 15 July, Astana announced the signing of Mikhail Gabyshev from Shakhter Karagandy.

On 25 July, Sagi Sovet joined Maktaaral on loan for the remember of the season.

On 10 August, Astana announced the signing of free agent Keelan Lebon, who'd last played for Beroe Stara Zagora.

On 6 September, Astana announced that Rai Vloet had been sold to Ural Yekaterinburg after they had exercised a release clause in Vloet contract.

On 13 September, Blagojević left Astana by mutual consent to become Head Coach of Debreceni, with Grigori Babayan returning to the club as their new Head Coach.

Squad

On loan

Transfers

In

Loans in

Out

Loans out

Released

Trial

Friendlies

Competitions

Overview

Premier League

Results summary

Results by round

Results

League table

Kazakhstan Cup

Group stage

Knockout stage

UEFA Europa Conference League

Qualifying rounds

Squad statistics

Appearances and goals

|-
|colspan="16"|Players away from Astana on loan:

|-
|colspan="16"|Players who left Astana during the season:

|}

Goal scorers

Clean sheets

Disciplinary record

References

External links
Official Website 
Official VK

FC Astana seasons
Astana
Astana